Bommidi is a panchayat town which is located in Pappireddipatti taluka of Dharmapuri district in Tamil Nadu, India. It is also known as B. Mallapuram. Bommidi's name is used for the railway station, the police station situated at Nadur, the post office, and bus transportation, while the name "B. Mallapuram" is used for schools, hospitals, and government officials.

Geography

It is in the southern region of the district. 
Bommidi is close to the Salem district border. It is surrounded by Yercaud Hills, Kavaramalai RF and Mookanur Hills.

Transport

Bommidi has rail and bus connectivity with Chennai, Salem, Coimbatore, Mangalore, Allepy, Dhanbad, etc.

Road
A number of buses run from Dharmapuri to Salem via Bommidi. Tamil Nadu State Transport Corporation (TNSTC) operates daily straight buses to Chennai, Bangalore, Trichy, Coimbatore, Palani, Madurai and very frequent bus services to Salem, Dharmapuri, Omalur, and Harur.

Trains
It is connected by rail. Bommidi can be reached from Salem and Dharmapuri. Bommidi Railway Station is on the Coimbatore-Chennai railway line.

There is also an 11 km railway line proposal for linking Bommidi railway station lying in Salem - Jolarpettai line to Muttampatti railway station lying in Salem - Dharmapuri line. The railway station in Bommidi was built in 1861 and is one of the oldest railway stations in Tamil Nadu. Trains from Kerala to New Delhi, Chennai, and Tirupati pass through Bommidi. Bommidi has direct trains to Tirupathi, Chennai, Bangalore, Mangalore, Mumbai, Kanyakumari, and Coimbatore.

Airport
Nearest airport: Salem Airport, is 39 KM from Bommidi, Coimbatore Airport to Bommidi 210 Km, Bengalore Airport to Bommidi 190 Km. The nearest city is Salem.

References

External links

Cities and towns in Dharmapuri district